Nitro Circus: The Movie is a 2012 American 3D action comedy reality film based on the MTV eponymous reality comedy series. Directed by Gregg Godfrey and Jeremy Rawle, it was both a critical and commercial failure, grossing little more than half its $7 million budget.

Cast
 Gregg Godfrey as himself
 Jeremy Rawle as himself
 Travis Pastrana as himself
 Jolene Van Vugt as herself
 Streetbike Tommy as himself
 Jim DeChamp as himself
 Special Greg as himself
 Erik Roner as himself

Interviews
 Jeff Tremaine
 Johnny Knoxville
 Channing Tatum
 Rob Dyrdek
 Ryan Sheckler
 Ken Block
 Bill Gerber
 Bob Burnquist
 Dick Godfrey
 Dov Ribnick

Reception
Nitro Circus: The Movie received extremely negative reviews, currently holding 6% on Rotten Tomatoes. The film grossed $3,377,618 domestically and an additional $806,697 overseas for a worldwide total of $4,183,697.

References

External links
 
 
 
 
 

2012 films
2012 3D films
2012 action comedy films
American 3D films
American action comedy films
Films based on television series
Films shot in the Las Vegas Valley
Films shot in Maryland
Films shot in North Carolina
Films shot in Panama
Films shot in Utah
American independent films
2010s English-language films
2010s American films
2012 independent films